Mitteilungen der Altorientalischen Gesellschaft, often abbreviated MAOG, is a German magazine on the art of the Near East, published in Leipzig. It is often referenced in works related to Near-Eastern art. The magazine was founded in 1925.

References

Visual arts magazines published in Germany
German-language magazines
Magazines published in Leipzig
1925 establishments in Germany
Magazines established in 1925